José Luis Félix Chilavert González (born 27 July 1965) is a Paraguayan former professional footballer who played as a goalkeeper for Sportivo Luqueño, Guaraní, San Lorenzo de Almagro, Real Zaragoza, Vélez Sarsfield, RC Strasbourg, Peñarol, and the Paraguay national team.

Chilavert won 12 club titles, including the 1994 Copa Libertadores and the 1994 Intercontinental Cup, while playing for Vélez Sarsfield, and is a three-time IFFHS World's Best Goalkeeper award winner. A fast and agile shot-stopper, known for his leadership, strong personality, and goalkeeping ability, he was regarded as one of the best goalkeepers in the world in his prime; outside of his goalkeeping position, Chilavert was also known for his outfield skills and ability as a free kick specialist, and often took penalties. He scored 67 goals in his professional career, many of them crucial, including eight in international matches. Four of his international goals were scored during Paraguay's qualification for the 2002 FIFA World Cup. Chilavert is the second-highest goalscoring goalkeeper of all time, surpassed only by Brazilian keeper Rogerio Ceni, and is one of only three goalkeepers to score a hat-trick. Chilavert was also known for his eccentricity and his fiery temper, which brought him his fair share of controversies; most notorious among them was his being sent off in 1997 for brawling with Colombian striker Faustino Asprilla. He was nicknamed "El Buldog" ("The Bulldog") and often wore a cartoon bulldog on his goalkeeper jersey.

Chilavert appeared for the Paraguay national football team 74 times from 1989 to 2003, scoring 8 goals and representing the team at five major tournaments. Chilavert appeared for Paraguay at two FIFA World Cup tournaments (1998 and 2002), where he served as captain on both occasions, and appeared in three Copa América tournaments (1991, 1993, and 1997). Chilavert was also included in the 1998 FIFA World Cup Team of the Tournament.

Early years
Chilavert grew up in Luque, Gran Asunción, in a poor family, and walked barefoot until the age of seven. His parents were Catalino Chilavert, a state bureaucrat, and Nicolasa González. At the age of five, he had three siblings and two responsibilities: to milk cows and sell the milk in Ñu Guazú, a rural suburb of Luque. One of his siblings, Rolando Chilavert, is also a football player.

Club career
Chilavert made his footballing debut with Sportivo Luqueño, where he was trained by Modesto Sandoval. In 1989, he played for the Paraguay national team for the first time.

He later moved to Spain, where he played for Real Zaragoza. In 1988, whilst Chilavert played for Real Zaragoza, he stated that "the fans used to freak out" when he would come out with the ball at his feet and "scream at me to get back in goal. I've never stopped to think about what others are saying. I just rely on my abilities. Later on, I started to practice penalties and free kicks until they gave me the job for real". Chilavert admitted to staying behind after training to practice 80 to 120 free kicks, which in his opinion was how he got better.

 After his time at Real Zaragoza, he moved to Argentina, where he played with Vélez Sársfield, helping them win the Primera División four times, as well as the Copa Libertadores and the Intercontinental Cup, both in 1994. In 1999, he became the first goalkeeper known to score a hat-trick in the history of professional football, while playing for Vélez against Ferro Carril Oeste, scoring all three goals through penalties. He also scored a free kick from behind the half-way line against River Plate.

In the 2001 Coupe de France Final, Chilavert scored the winning penalty in the shootout victory over Amiens SC.

International career

Chilavert was voted World Goalkeeper of the Year by the IFFHS in 1995, 1997, and 1998. He was sent off alongside Faustino Asprilla in the qualifiers, in which Asprilla had to convince a hitman to not murder Chilavert afterwards. Chilavert participated in the 1998 World Cup, where he became the first goalkeeper ever to take a direct free kick in the World Cup finals, almost scoring against Bulgaria. With two clean sheets in the first round, he helped take Paraguay to the round of sixteen, where the team lost to France on a golden goal scored by Laurent Blanc. Chilavert had made boasts about being the Cup's best goalkeeper before the tournament, and after the tournament, FIFA indeed named Chilavert on the tournament All-Star Squad for his performances, alongside French goalkeeper Fabien Barthez.

Chilavert refused to take part in the 1999 Copa América, angering the Paraguayan government, as he claimed funding should be used for education.

FIFA gave Chilavert a four-game suspension (later reduced to three) for spitting on Brazil's Roberto Carlos at the conclusion of a 2002 FIFA World Cup qualification game. As a result, he watched Paraguay's first game of the 2002 World Cup against South Africa from the stands. Chilavert accused Roberto Carlos of racism and of making obscene gestures during the match. Chilavert later claimed that Roberto Carlos came up to him after the match and said "Indian, we have won 2–0, you are a disaster". He also justified his action by saying he had been provoked by the Brazilians, who had called him the weakest link of Paraguay before the match, and also claimed the match was like a war and that Brazil should return land to Paraguay lost in the War of the Triple Alliance in the 19th century.

Before the 2002 FIFA World Cup, Paraguay manager Cesare Maldini had faced criticism in Paraguay, but Chilavert defended Maldini for his experience. He also expressed great confidence in the ability of the Paraguayan team and downplayed his role on the team. During the World Cup, Chilavert made an error against Spain on Morientes's 2–1 goal as Paraguay lost 3–1. Chilavert almost redeemed himself later with a good free kick attempt, but the shot was saved by Casillas. Before the match, Chilavert had vowed to score against Spain if Paraguay got a free kick "within range". Before the last match in the group stage, Paraguay had to beat Slovenia and Spain had to beat South Africa, with a combined margin of three goals, for Paraguay to go through to the last 16. The match started badly for Paraguay, with Carlos Paredes sent off in the 21st minute, and continued with Milenko Ačimovič taking the lead for the Slovenians right before half-time after Chilavert failed to grip the ball and allowed it to slip between his legs into the goal. But Paraguay – inspired by substitutes Nelson Cuevas and Jorge Campos – recovered to defeat Slovenia 3–1, scoring three times in the last 25 minutes, and when Spain also defeated South Africa 3–2, that victory meant that Paraguay was through to the next round, where they would play Germany. In their second-round match against Germany, despite several saves from Chilavert, Paraguay lost 1–0, courtesy of a late Oliver Neuville goal.

In total, Chilavert earned 74 international caps for Paraguay and achieved a goalkeeper record of eight international goals. He retired from international football in 2003.

Retirement and post-career

Chilavert announced his retirement from football in December 2003, but decided to come out of retirement to return to Vélez. Chilavert had just won the Uruguayan league with Peñarol when he initially retired. He finally retired permanently in 2004, playing his last match, a farewell testimonial, on 11 November of that year – fittingly, he scored a goal.

In 2005, Chilavert received a suspended six-month prison sentence in France for the use of false documents related to the compensation for the end of his contract with Strasbourg.

Chilavert was a commentator for American television network Univision during the 2006 FIFA World Cup and 2010 FIFA World Cup, alongside Jorge Pérez-Navarro. Chilavert vowed that if he had gone to the 2006 FIFA World Cup in Germany, he would have tried again to become the first goalkeeper to score a goal.

Personal life and personality

Chilavert is married to Marcela, an English language teacher he met in Buenos Aires while playing for San Lorenzo de Almagro. In 1998, they had a daughter named Anahí.

Controversies
Chilavert has allegedly thrown punches at Faustino Asprilla and Diego Maradona. He was suspended for four matches for his altercation with the former that occurred during a World Cup qualifier in 1997.

He once received a suspended prison sentence for attacking a physiotherapist.

Chilavert was a guest commentator for Univision during the Copa América Centenario but was removed from the broadcasts after CONMEBOL President Alejandro Dominguez told the network to remove Chilavert. Chilavert had criticized Dominguez and called him corrupt on the air during Paraguay's Group A match against Colombia.

In 2018, Chilavert called for the expulsion of the British ambassador to Paraguay Matthew Hedges after the latter made controversial statements about the conviction of 12 farmers in a case relating to the violent deaths of six police officers and 11 rural workers in 2012. During the altercation, Chilavert made anglophobic and homophobic comments, the latter referencing Hedges's homosexuality, calling him 'anormal'.

Leadership and morality

Chilavert defended Cesare Maldini from the members of the Paraguayan press who criticized Maldini when he was appointed as Paraguay's coach for the 2002 FIFA World Cup. Chilavert stated that "About 90% of sports journalists in Paraguay are incompetent" and welcomed criticism following Paraguay's performance in Korea and Japan if they were to perform poorly.

During his career, Chilavert was being touted as Paraguay's future president. Chilavert was labelled "a revolutionary the kind of which South America has not seen since the days of Che Guevara."

Off the field, Chilavert refused to participate at the 1999 Copa América, held in Paraguay, complaining about the incompetence of the local directors. Despite being officially honored by the government, he said that his country should invest money in education rather than football. Chilavert also routinely dismissed his country's politicians as corrupt, incompetent, and responsible for keeping many Paraguayans in poverty. Chilavert claimed that when his playing days were over, he would stand for president and enforce his own brand of law and order.

During 2008 and 2009, the former goalkeeper demonstrated his support for Paraguayan Olympic thrower Edgar Baumann against corruption in Paraguayan sport when the athlete had been robbed of his right to compete at the 2000 Sydney Olympics due to a scandal from the Paraguayan Olympic Committee. Chilavert supported Baumann during the lawsuit which had been filed against the Olympic Committee with Chilavert stated that the then president of the Olympic Committee, Ramón Zubizarreta, should be expulsed for hurting athletes and not giving them benefits.

In 2009, Chilavert, along with Claudio Escauriza, Tomás Orué and lawyer Alejandro Rubin, attended a Press Conference at Asunción Shopping Centre Shopping del Sol, in support Edgar Baumann, who had received a favourable ruling from the Paraguay Supreme Court in a case against the Paraguay Olympic Committee president Ramón Zubizarreta for robbing him the right of competing at the 2000 Summer Olympics and also taking his sums of money that he earned from his scholarship.

Career statistics

Club

International

Scores and results list Paraguay's goal tally first, score column indicates score after each Chilavert goal.

Honours

Guarani
Primera División: 1984

Vélez Sársfield
 Primera División: 1993 Clausura, 1995 Apertura, 1996 Clausura, 1998 Clausura
 Copa Libertadores: 1994
 Intercontinental Cup: 1994
 Copa Interamericana: 1994 (played in 1996)
 Supercopa Sudamericana: 1996
 Recopa Sudamericana: 1997

Strasbourg
Coupe de France: 2000–01

Peňarol
Primera División: 2003

Individual
Equipo Ideal de América: 1994, 1995, 1996, 1997, 1998, 1999
IFFHS World's Best Goalkeeper: 1995, 1997, 1998
Footballer of the Year of Argentina: 1996
South American Footballer of the Year: 1996
FIFA World Cup: All-star team 1998
FIFA XI: 2001
World Soccer: The 100 Greatest Footballers of All Time
IFFHS Legends

References

External links

IFFHS' World's Best Goalkeeper of the Year at RSSSF
The World's most successful goalscoring Goalkeepers of all time at IFFHS

1965 births
Living people
Sportspeople from Luque
Paraguayan footballers
Association football goalkeepers
Sportivo Luqueño players
Club Guaraní players
Real Zaragoza players
RC Strasbourg Alsace players
San Lorenzo de Almagro footballers
Club Atlético Vélez Sarsfield footballers
Peñarol players
Argentine Primera División players
La Liga players
Ligue 1 players
Ligue 2 players
Uruguayan Primera División players
South American Footballer of the Year winners
Paraguay international footballers
1991 Copa América players
1993 Copa América players
1997 Copa América players
1998 FIFA World Cup players
2002 FIFA World Cup players
Paraguayan expatriate footballers
Paraguayan expatriate sportspeople in Argentina
Paraguayan expatriate sportspeople in Spain
Paraguayan expatriate sportspeople in France
Paraguayan expatriate sportspeople in Uruguay
Expatriate footballers in Argentina
Expatriate footballers in Spain
Expatriate footballers in France
Expatriate footballers in Uruguay